Gekko tokehos, the Cambodian parachute gecko, is a species of lizard. It is found in Cambodia, Thailand, and Vietnam.

References 

Gekko
Reptiles described in 2019